The 1997–98 Welsh Alliance League was the fourteenth season of the Welsh Alliance League after its establishment in 1984. The league was won by Holyhead Hotspur.

League table

References

External links
Welsh Alliance League

Welsh Alliance League seasons
3
Wales